Christian Martínez may refer to:

Christian Martínez (footballer, born 1979), Mexican football goalkeeper
Christian Martínez (footballer, born 1983), Chilean football midfielder
Christian Martínez (Honduran footballer) (born 1990), Honduran football striker
Christian Martínez (footballer, born October 1990), Mexican football midfielder
Christian Martínez (footballer, born 1994), Salvadoran football midfielder

See also
 Cristian Martínez (disambiguation)
 Cristhian Martínez (born 1982), Dominican baseball player